The 194th Intelligence Squadron is an intelligence unit of the United States Air Force It was activated in 2006. Its parent unit is the 194th Regional Support Wing.

Mission
The 194 IS provides tailored target and geospatial intelligence to the Air Component to enable precision engagement and effective operations. Providing Aimpoint Development, Precise Point Mensuration, Weaponeering, and Collateral Damage Assessment, the 194 IS has quickly become one of the premier combat targeting intelligence units in the nation.

History

Assignments

Major Command/Gaining Command
Air National Guard/Air Combat Command (2006 – present)

Previous designations
194th Intelligence Squadron (2006 – present)

Bases stationed
Camp Murray (2006 – present)

Decorations
 Air Force Outstanding Unit Award (1 November 2005 – 31 October 2007)

References

External links

https://web.archive.org/web/20090815133001/http://www.194rsw.ang.af.mil/units/

Squadrons of the United States Air National Guard
Military units and formations in Washington (state)
194